Banksia ser. Spicigerae is a taxonomic series in the genus Banksia. It consists of the seven species in section Oncostylis that have cylindrical inflorescences. These range in form from small shrubs to tall trees. The leaves grow in either an alternate or whorled pattern, with various shape forms. The Spicigerae inflorescence is held erect, subtended by a whorl of branchlets, and retains a regular pattern until anthesis. The perianth limb is horizontal until anthesis, at which point the perianth opens from underneath. The pollen-presenter is ovoid or conical. The seed wings are not notched.

Taxa
Five of the Spicigerae are endemic to southwest Western Australia. The other two, Banksia ericifolia (Heath-leaved Banksia) and Banksia spinulosa (Hairpin Banksia), are endemic to the east coast of Australia.  It is therefore thought to be the oldest of the series, having developed before the onset of aridity in the Nullarbor Plain.

Species and subspecies
B. spinulosa comprising:
B. s. var. collina
B. s. var. cunninghamii
B. s. var. neoanglica
B. s. var. spinulosa
B. ericifolia comprising:
B. e. var. ericifolia
B. e. var. macrantha
B. verticillata
B. seminuda
B. littoralis
B. occidentalis
B. brownii

See also
 Taxonomy of Banksia

References

External links

 ser. Spicigerae
Plant series